Ganesh Kumar Limbu is a Bharatiya Janata Party politician from Assam. Ganesh Kumar Limbu was born to Late Padam Bahadur Limbu. He has been elected in Assam Legislative Assembly election in 2016 from Barchalla constituency.

References 

Living people
Bharatiya Janata Party politicians from Assam
Assam MLAs 2016–2021
People from Sonitpur district
Year of birth missing (living people)
Assam MLAs 2021–2026
Limbu people